Epipaschia ochrotalis is a species of snout moth in the genus Epipaschia. It is found in French Guiana.

References

Moths described in 1906
Epipaschiinae